Echorouk News is an Arabic language satellite television channel broadcasting from Algiers. Echourouk News was set up by Echourouk Group with a number of Arab intellectuals from Algeria and the Arab World.

History
Echorouk News was founded on 19 March 2014, it has started to broadcast its programs on 19 March 2014.

Programming

News 
 , main news bulletin.
 , sports news bulletin.
 , weather forecasts.

Current affairs 
 , morning show;
 , talk show broadcast only during ramadan;
 , show featuring reports;
 , a show featuring special reports by Echorouk News reporters.

Documentaries

Events 
Notable events to which Echorouk News hold broadcasting rights include:

Football 
 Belgian First Division A (2016–2017)

On-air staff

Weather 
 Siham Benmeziane (2017–)
 Kamelia Dina Boualili (2017–)
 Cheikh Ferhat (2013–2016)
 Radah Kalloul (2014–2014)
 Radia Sediki (2013–2016)
 Meriem Tahri (2014–2016)
 Hana Touati (2017–)

Correspondents 
 Samia Mouaki

References

External links
 echoroukonline.com

Arab mass media
Television in Algeria
Arabic-language television stations
Arabic-language television
 
Television channels and stations established in 2014
Television stations in Algeria